"Thursday" is a song by English singer-songwriter Jess Glynne. It was released through Atlantic on 11 October 2018 as the third single from her second studio album, Always in Between (2018). The song was written by Jess Glynne, Ed Sheeran and Steve Mac. Glynne described the song as one of her favourites, stating that the song is close to her heart.

Background
"Thursday" was written by Glynne, Ed Sheeran and Steve Mac. It was the second song Glynne and Mac had worked together on, after the former's 2015 single "Take Me Home". In an interview with Billboard, Glynne spoke about the writing process. "We spoke about the highs and lows of being famous and doing the job that we do. It was really cool because for me as an artist, I don't really work with that many artists, and obviously you never know how it is for someone else and you feel like you don't know whether that's just you."

Live performances
 Strictly Come Dancing (4 November 2018)

 The BRITs Are Coming show (12 January 2019)

 2019 Brit Awards (20 February 2019) (with H.E.R.)

Track listing

Charts

Weekly charts

Year-end charts

Certifications

References

2018 singles
2018 songs
Jess Glynne songs
Song recordings produced by Steve Mac
Songs written by Jess Glynne
Songs written by Steve Mac
Songs written by Ed Sheeran
Atlantic Records singles
Number-one singles in Scotland